Rehoboth is an unincorporated community in Seneca County, in the U.S. state of Ohio.

History
Rehoboth was laid out in 1844.

References

Unincorporated communities in Seneca County, Ohio
Unincorporated communities in Ohio